The 2011 Oceania Weightlifting Championships took place at the Darwin Entertainment Centre in Darwin, Australia from 11 to 13 May 2011.

Together with that year's Arafura Games weightlifting competition, they were held concurrently as a single event designated the 2011 Arafura Games & Oceania Championships. Athletes from certain countries were able to contest multiple championships simultaneously (including age-group variants).

Medal summary
Note that the results shown below are for the senior competition only. Junior and youth results are cited here and here respectively.

Medal table

Men

Women

References

Oceania Weightlifting Championships
Oceania Weightlifting Championships
International weightlifting competitions hosted by Australia
Sport in Darwin, Northern Territory
Oceania Weightlifting Championships